Anatoliy Anatoliyovych Nuriyev (born 20 May 1996) is a professional footballer who plays as an attacking midfielder or as a centre-forward for Sabah. Born in Ukraine, he represents the Azerbaijan national team.

Career 
Nuriyev began his career playing for the DYuFC Mukacheve, BRW-BIK Volodymyr-Volynskyi, FC Hoverla Uzhhorod, FC Mukacheve, Munkach Mukacheve, and FC Serednie youth clubs.

In 2016–17 he became the top scorer of the Zakarpattia Oblast regional football championship with 25 goals in 17 games. Later Nuriyev have signed with FC Stal Kamianske and played 7 games in the Ukrainian Premier League for the club. Just before joining the Ukrainian Second League, FC Mynai that wanted to sign the player previously finally managed to accomplish it.

International career
Nuriyev was born in Mukachevo, Ukraine, to a father from Azerbaijan, and a Ukrainian mother. His international career started at the 2019 Summer Universiade in Naples, Italy where he represented the Ukraine student team.

He debuted for the Azerbaijan national team in a 1–0 2022 FIFA World Cup qualification loss to Portugal on 24 March 2021.

International goals

Honours
Mynai
 Ukrainian First League: 2019–20

References

External links
 
 
 

1996 births
Living people
People from Mukachevo
Citizens of Azerbaijan through descent
Azerbaijani footballers
Azerbaijan international footballers
Ukrainian footballers
Azerbaijani people of Ukrainian descent
Ukrainian people of Azerbaijani descent
Association football forwards
Azerbaijan Premier League players
Ukrainian Premier League players
Ukrainian First League players
Ukrainian Second League players
FC Hoverla Uzhhorod players
MFA Mukachevo players
FC Stal Kamianske players
FC Mynai players
FC Kolos Kovalivka players
Sumgayit FK players
Sabah FC (Azerbaijan) players
Azerbaijani expatriate footballers
Expatriate footballers in Ukraine
Azerbaijani expatriate sportspeople in Ukraine
Ukraine student international footballers
Sportspeople from Zakarpattia Oblast